Ariel Jakubowski (born 7 September 1977) is a Polish football coach and former footballer.

Career

Club
In May 2011, he was released from Ruch Chorzów.

In July 2011, he joined Wisła Płock.

International
He was a part of Poland national football team. He played one time in 1999.

Coaching career
In January 2020, Jakubowski returned to Ursus Warszawa to coach the club's U17 squad.

Honours
ŁKS Łódź
Ekstraklasa: 1997–98

References

External links
 
 
 Ariel Jakubowski at Footballdatabase

1977 births
Living people
Sportspeople from Pomeranian Voivodeship
People from Człuchów
Polish footballers
Association football defenders
Poland international footballers
Polonia Gdańsk players
Odra Wodzisław Śląski players
Ruch Chorzów players
GKS Katowice players
ŁKS Łódź players
Lech Poznań players
Wisła Płock players
Jagiellonia Białystok players
Ekstraklasa players
I liga players
Polish football managers
Wigry Suwałki managers
I liga managers
II liga managers